"Fire" and "Jericho" are two songs recorded by English electronica/rave act the Prodigy (both were later released under the name "Fire/Jericho", the band's third single on 14 September 1992). It peaked at number eleven on the UK Singles Chart.

The single was sub-titled "Strangely Limited Edition" due to the 12-inch vinyl record being deleted after two weeks. This was to move the focus over to the release of the debut album, Experience, following a few weeks later. Even when the single was re-released, the subtitle was still standing.

"Fire"

"Fire" uses the sample "I am the god of Hell fire, and I bring you (fire)" from The Crazy World of Arthur Brown's 1968 single of the same name. The "fire" vocal sample following "...I bring you" is taken from Daddy Freddy's "Live Jam". It samples the vocal "When I was a youth I used to burn collie weed in a Rizla" from the track "Hard Times" by Pablo Gad.

Liam Howlett commented at the time that in contrast to most rave music being associated with the drug ecstasy, "Fire" was more inspired by marijuana, which was equally prevalent among ravers: "It's a smokin' song instead of an ecstasy-feel rave song. It's got a reggae feel to it, because I want to link it up to the whole smoking vibe, 'cos at the end of the day everyone who goes out raving puffs."

"Jericho"

"Jericho" uses an interpolation of the distinct melody in "Kunta Kinte" by the Revolutionaries. This track was also remixed by British electronic group Genaside II. Their mix begins with a sample of Front 242's "Welcome to Paradise", a song that cites the words of American preacher Pastor Ferell Griswold "Hey poor you don't have to be poor anymore"

"Fire" video

A video was directed by frequent collaborator Russell Curtis, but the band didn't like the result and it remained unreleased at the time. In particular, the Prodigy were dissatisfied with the quality of the computer graphics, even though it had been by far their most expensive video production up to this point (with scenes of the band sitting around a campfire shot in a mountain scenery in Wales). The video did however turn up on a compilation from XL called The Video Chapter. Due to its rarity, this video has been much sought after by fans. The music video can now be viewed on the official Prodigy YouTube channel, or through the Prodigy's official website.
The video was left off their 2005 compilation Their Law: The Singles 1990–2005.

Track listing

XL

7-inch vinyl record
A. "Fire" (Edit) (3:21)
AA. "Jericho" (Original Version) (3:47)

12-inch vinyl record
"Fire" (Burning Version) (4:42)
"Fire" (Sunrise Version) (5:05)
"Jericho" (Original Version) (3:47)
"Jericho" (Genaside II Remix) (5:45)

CD single
"Fire" (Edit) (3:21)
"Jericho" (Original Version) (3:47)
"Fire" (Sunrise Version) (5:05)
"Jericho" (Genaside II Remix) (5:45)

Elektra CD single
"Fire" (Edit) (3:21)
"Jericho" (Original Version) (3:47)
"Fire" (Sunrise Version) (5:05)
"Jericho" (Genaside II Remix) (5:45)
"Pandemonium" (4:25)

Charts

References

Songs about cannabis
The Prodigy songs
1992 singles
XL Recordings singles
Songs written by Liam Howlett
1992 songs
Elektra Records singles
Music Week number-one dance singles